Lord of the manor is a title that, in Anglo-Saxon England, referred to the landholder of a rural estate. The lord enjoyed manorial rights (the rights to establish and occupy a residence, known as the manor house and demesne) as well as seignory, the right to grant or draw benefit from the estate. The title continues in modern England and Wales as a legally recognised form of property that can be held independently of its historical rights. It may belong entirely to one person or be a moiety shared with other people.

Types

Historically a lord of the manor could either be a tenant-in-chief if he held a capital manor directly from the Crown, or a mesne lord if he was the vassal of another lord. The origins of the lordship of manors arose in the Anglo-Saxon system of manorialism. Following the Norman conquest, land at the manorial level was recorded in the Domesday Book of 1086 (the Normans' registry in Sicily was called, in Latin, the Catalogus Baronum, compiled a few years later). The title cannot nowadays be subdivided. This has been prohibited since 1290 by the statute of Quia Emptores that prevents tenants from alienating their lands to others by subinfeudation, instead requiring all tenants wishing to alienate their land to do so by substitution.

Lord Denning, in Corpus Christi College Oxford v Gloucestershire County Council [1983] QB 360, described the manor thus:

Use of style
The holder of a lordship of the manor can be styled as Charles S, Lord/Lady of the Manor of [Placename], sometimes shortened to Lord or Lady of [Placename]. This style can be shared by spouses.

It is debated whether manorial lordships are classed as a noble title. They are a semi-extinct form of hereditary landed title that grants the holder the rank of Esquire by prescription and are considered high gentry or lower, non-peerage nobility by contemporary heralds and students of nobiliary. Lordship in this sense is a synonym for ownership, although this ownership involved a historic legal jurisdiction in the form of the court baron. The journal Justice of the Peace & Local Government Law advises that the position is unclear as to whether a lordship of a manor is a title of honour or a dignity, as this is yet to be tested by the courts. Technically, lords of manors are barons, or freemen; however, they do not use the term as a title. Unlike titled barons, they did not have a right to sit in the House of Lords, which was the case for all noble peers until the House of Lords Act 1999. John Selden in his esteemed work Titles of Honour (1672) writes, "The word Baro (Latin for Baron) hath been also so much communicated, that not only all Lords of Manors have been from ancient time, and are at this day called sometimes Barons (as in the stile of their Court Barons, which is Curia Baronis, &c. And I have read hors de son Barony in a barr to an Avowry for hors de son fee) But also the Judges of the Exchequer have it from antient time fixed on them."

The style 'Lord of the Manor of X' or 'Lord of X' is, in a sense, more of a description than a title, somewhat similar to the term Laird in Scotland. King's College, Cambridge has given the view that the term 'indicated wealth and privilege, and it carried rights and responsibilities'.

Manorial rights or incidents
Since 1965 lords of the manor have been entitled to compensation in the event of compulsory purchase. Before the Land Registration Act 2002 it was possible for manors to be registered with HM Land Registry. No manorial rights could be created after 1925, following entry into force of the Law of Property Act 1922. Manorial incidents, which are the rights that a lord of the manor may exercise over other people's land, lapsed on 12 October 2013 if not registered by then with the Land Registry. This is a separate issue to the registration of lordships of manors, since both registered and unregistered lordships will continue to exist after that date. It is only their practical rights that lost what is called 'overriding interest', or in other words the ability to affect land even if the interests or rights are not registered against that land, as of 12 October 2013. Manorial incidents can still be recorded for either registered or unregistered manors; however, proof of existence of the rights may need to be submitted to the Land Registry before they will be noted and they may not be registered at all after affected land is sold after 12 October 2013. This issue does not affect the existence of the title of lord of the manor. There have been cases where manors have been sold and the seller has unknowingly parted with rights to unregistered land in England and Wales.

Tenancy
In England in the Middle Ages, land was held on behalf of the English monarch or ruler by a powerful local supporter, who gave protection in return. The people who had sworn homage to the lord were known as vassals. Vassals were nobles who served loyalty for the king, in return for being given the use of land. After the Norman conquest of England, however, all land in England was owned by the monarch who then granted the use of it by means of a transaction known as enfeoffment, to earls, barons, and others, in return for military service. The person who held feudal land directly from the king was known as a tenant-in-chief (see also Land tenure).

Sub-tenancy
Military service was based upon units of ten knights (see Knight-service). An important tenant-in-chief might be expected to provide all ten knights, and lesser tenants-in-chief, half of one. Some tenants-in-chief 'sub-infeuded', that is, granted, some land to a sub-tenant. Further sub-infeudation could occur down to the level of a lord of a single manor, which in itself might represent only a fraction of a knight's fee. A mesne lord was the level of lord in the middle holding several manors, between the lords of a manor and the superior lord. The sub-tenant might have to provide knight-service, or finance just a portion of it, or pay something purely nominal. Knight-service was abolished by the Tenures Abolition Act 1660.

Manorial courts

Manors were defined as an area of land and became closely associated to the advowson of the church; often by default the advowson was appended to the rights of the Manor, sometimes separated into moieties. Many lords of the manor were known as squires, at a time when land ownership was the basis of power. While some inhabitants were serfs who were bound to the land, others were freeholders, often known as franklins, who were free from customary services. Periodically all the tenants met at a 'manorial court', with the lord of the manor (or squire), or a steward, as chairman. These courts, known as courts baron, dealt with the tenants' rights and duties, changes of occupancy, and disputes between tenants. Some manorial courts also had the status of a court leet, and so they elected constables and other officials and were effectively magistrates' courts for minor offences.

Later history
The tenure of the freeholders was protected by the royal courts. After the Black Death, labour was in demand and so it became difficult for the lords of manors to impose duties on serfs. However their customary tenure continued and in the 16th century the royal courts also began to protect these customary tenants, who became known as copyholders. The name arises because the tenant was given a copy of the court's record of the fact as a title deed.

During the 19th century, traditional manor courts were phased out. This was largely because by the mid 17th century, large English cities had leading residents such as John Harrison (died 1656) of Leeds, who saw the possession of the manor by only one resident as "giving him too great a superiority over his fellow townsmen, and exposing him to considerable odium". Thus, the Manor of Leeds was divided between several people (shares). This situation could create legal problems. In January 1872, as a group, the "lords of the manor of Leeds" applied to the Law Courts to ascertain if they could "exercise acts of ownership" over land at a time when manorial  rights were being sold to larger city corporations. In 1854, the lords of the manor of Leeds had "sold" these acts of ownership to the "corporation of Leeds" which would become the City of Leeds.

By  1925, copyhold tenure had formally ended with the enactment of Law of Property Acts, Law of Property Act 1922 and Law of Property (Amendment) Act 1924, converting copyhold to fee simple. Although copyhold was abolished, the title of Lord of the Manor remains, and certain rights attached to it will also remain if they are registered under the Land Registration Act 2002. This Act ended manorial incidents unprotected by registration at the Land Registry after October 2013. The Land Registration Act 2002 does not affect the existence of unregistered lordships after October 2013, only the rights that would have previously been attached to the same.

During the latter part of the 20th century, many of these titles were sold to wealthy individuals seeking a distinction. However, certain purchasers, such as Mark Roberts, controversially exploited the right to claim unregistered land. A manorial title (i.e. Lord of the Manor) is not a title of nobility, as in a peerage title.

Today

Feudal lordships of the manor exist today in English property law, being legal titles historically dating back to the Norman invasion of England in 1066. Being incorporated into property law (whether physical or non-physical) they can be bought and sold, as historic artifacts. The title itself as stated below can be separated from the physical property just as any other right can. Rights like the lordship, mineral and sporting can all be separate from the physical property. The title since 1290 cannot be sub-divided. Land, sporting rights, and mineral rights can be separated. Property lawyers usually handle such transactions.

There are three elements to a manor (collectively called an honour):
 the lordship or dignity – the title granted by the manor,
 the manorial – the manor and its land,
 the seignory – the rights granted to the holder of the manor.

These three elements may exist separately or be combined, the first element being the title may be held in moieties and may not be subdivided, this is prohibited by the statute of  preventing subinfeudation whereas the second and third elements can be subdivided. Although manorial lordship titles today no longer have rights attached to them, historically the lordship title itself had the power to collect fealty (i.e. services) and taxes.

The Historical Manuscripts Commission maintains two Manorial Document Registers that cover southern England. One register is arranged under parishes, the other is arranged under manors and shows the last-known whereabouts of the manorial records, the records are often very limited. The National Archives at Kew, London, and county record offices maintain many documents that mention manors or manorial rights, in some cases manorial court rolls have survived, such documents are now protected by law.

The issues of land claims were raised in the UK Parliament in 2004 and were debated with a reply on the subject from the Parliamentary Under-Secretary of State for Constitutional Affairs acknowledging 'need for reform of the remnants of feudal and manorial law' as a case was highlighted in Peterstone Wentloog, Wales, where villagers were being charged excessive fees to cross manorial land to access their homes.

In 2007, a caution against first registration caused houses to stop selling in Alstonefield after Mark Roberts, a businessman from Wales also previously involved in the Peterstone Wentloog case, registered a caution against first registration for  after purchasing the lordship of the manor of Alstonefield for £10,000 in 1999. Judith Bray, land law expert from Buckingham University, speaking to BBC about the case, said that "the legal situation is very confusing because a piece of legislation in the 1920s separated manorial rights from the ownership of land."

In reports about the Alstonefield case, the BBC stated, "Scores of titles are bought and sold every year, some like the one Chris Eubank bought for fun, others seen as a business opportunity. It is entirely lawful, and there is no doubt the titles can be valuable. As well as rights to land like wastes and commons, they can also give the holder rights over land." The report goes on to say that the Law Commission in England and Wales were considering a project to abolish feudal land law but would not review manorial rights.

In many cases, a title of lord of the manor may not have any land or rights, and in such cases the title is known as an 'incorporeal hereditament'. Before the Land Registration Act 2002 it was possible to volunteer to register lordship titles with the Land Registry; most did not seek to register. Dealings in previously registered Manors are subject to compulsory registration; however, lords of manors may opt to de-register their titles and they will continue to exist unregistered. Manorial rights such as mineral rights ceased to be registerable after midnight on 12 October 2013.

A manorial lordship or ladyship is not connected to the British honours system, but rather the feudal system. Ownership of a manorial lordship can be noted on request in British passports through an official observation worded, 'The Holder is the Lord of the Manor of ................'. The feudal title of lord of the manor, unlike titles of peerage, can be inherited by females. In addition, it is the only title that can be purchased. Lordships of the manor are considered non-physical property in England and are fully enforceable in the English court system. Like their English counterparts, by 1600 manorial titles in the formerly Norman territories in France and Italy did not ennoble their holders in the same way as, for example, did a barony. The status of lord of the manor is associated with the rank of esquire by prescription.

Mineral ownership
There were fears in 2014 and earlier, that holders of the manorial rights would allow fracking under the homes and near local communities of people living within the manorial estate after a disclosure that 73,000 applications to assert manorial mineral rights had been received by the Land Registry. Many of the applications received were from the Duchy of Lancaster and the Duchy of Cornwall asserting their historic "manorial mineral ownership".

See also

 English land law
 English feudal barony
 Feudalism
 Subinfeudation
 Mesne lord
 Fief
 Gentry
 Manor house
 Laird
 Esquire
 Squire

Notes and references

Notes

References

Further reading
Molyneux-Child, J. W. (1987) The evolution of the English manorial system. Lewes: The Book Guild.

External links
 Noble, princely, royal, and imperial titles
 British titles of nobility

1066 establishments in England
Feudalism in the British Isles
Titles in the United Kingdom
Positions of authority